Ridiculousness is an American comedy clip show that began airing on August 29, 2011. It is hosted by Rob Dyrdek and co-hosted by Steelo Brim and Chanel West Coast. Some episodes feature a celebrity special guest. Ridiculousness shows various viral videos from the Internet, usually involving failed do-it-yourself attempts at stunts, to which Rob and his panelists add mock commentary. Although the format bears some similarity to viewer-submission driven shows such as America's Funniest Home Videos, Ridiculousness producers, as well as the show's network, MTV, do not accept viewer submissions and air a disclaimer before and after each episode warning that, because of the dangerous nature of the stunts being shown, any attempts to submit a video to the show will not be considered.

Series overview

Episodes

Season 1 (2011)

Ending Segment: "The Ultimate Search" - At the end of each episode, Rob would search for a random video on Bing.

Season 2 (2012)
Note: This season has a new stage setting along with a new laptop stage.

Ending Segment: "High Speed Recap" - At the end of each episode, a 30-second montage of all the videos in the episode is played.

Season 3 (2013)
Note: Starting with this season, the guest walk on stage before greeting Rob and sitting on the couch with Steelo and Chanel.

Ending Segment: "Chanel's Best Guess" - At the end of each episode, Rob would display two words on the screen (in the Eddie Barbanell episode, three), and have Chanel guess what type of video would play.

Season 4 (2014)

Ending Segment: "B.Y.O.C." (Bring Your Own Clip) - At the end of each episode in Season 4, Rob would allow the guest to bring a clip of their choice. If there was no guest, then either Rob, Sterling, or Chanel would provide the clip (in the Jackson Nicoll episode, Rob brought the clip instead of Jackson).

Season 5 (2014)

Ending Segment: "Hashtag It" - At the end of each episode in the first half of Season 5, Rob would show a clip and Rob, Sterling, Chanel, and the guest would try to apply a funny hashtag to it. In the second half of Season 5 (starting with the Kylie and Kendall Jenner episode), the hashtag was revealed first, and the group would try to guess what kind of video would play.

Season 6 (2015)

Ending Segment: "Clip Roulette" - At the end of each episode, Rob would display stills of three different clips and the guest (or Chanel or Sterling) would choose one to play. The Mr. Rochelle episode and the Chanel and Sterling XVI episodes were originally taped for Season 5, so those two episodes features the "Hashtag It" closing segment. The episode with Brooks Wheelan did not include an ending segment.

Season 7 (2015–16)

Note: The first two episodes of this season were shot in New York at 1515 Broadway as opposed to Los Angeles. However, there was no laptop stage on the set. This is also the final season to use the laptop stage.

Ending Segment: Unlike previous seasons, the ending segment varied between each episode in Season 7. The most common segments are "Flash Forward", where Rob would play two clips in the style of "before and after", and "Not What It Looks/Sounds Like", where Rob would play a questionable sound or video clip, only to have it become something totally unexpected. Later episodes in the season omitted the ending segment.

Season 8 (2016)

Note: The oversized laptop is replaced with a new set.

Ending Segment: Like season 7, this varies between 2 segments, "Clip Hybrid" - where Rob would take two or more clips and mash them up together; and "Slo-Mo Ender" - where a slow-motion clip is played.

Season 9 (2017)

Ending Segment: "_ Or _?" - At the end of each episode in Season 9, Rob would ask a question in the form of "this or that", i.e. "Flash or Splash", and play a clip depending on their response. Although sometimes, the ending clip has both elements.

Season 10 (2017–18)

End segment: this season contained multiple end segments. The " or ?" ending returns from Season 9, but also seen is "Crowd Control", where Rob shows the names of two clips and allows the audience to choose which clip they would like to see by show of applause; and "Back That Clip Up", where Rob plays a clip backwards.

Season 11 (2018)
Note: This season has an all-new and simplified logo and the background of the set was changing color from red to blue.

Season 12 (2018–19)

Season 13 (2019)

Season 14 (2019)
The fourteenth season premiered on May 17, 2019 and ended on September 6, 2019.

Season 15 (2019)
Note: The fifteenth season premiere on September 7, 2019 and ended on December 29, 2019 on MTV. This is the final season to air in the 2010s.

Season 16 (2020)
Note: The sixteenth season premiered on January 6, 2020 on MTV, and ended on March 11, 2020. This is the first season to feature new episodes airing on Mondays through Thursdays on MTV since Season 9.

Season 17 (2020)
Note: The season premiered on April 20, 2020 on MTV, just a week after the end of Season 16. The rest of the season continued airing on August 17, 2020 and ended on September 14, 2020.

Season 18 (2020)
Note: Starting in season 18, audience seating was limited and seating between Steelo and Chanel are spaced 6 feet apart and appearances by guest celebrities (with the exception of Wells Adams, Lauv and Lamorne Morris) scarce due to the COVID-19 pandemic. Come the 500th episode, the area of the red sofa has been reconstructed with another red sofa added onto the current one.

Season 19 (2020–21)

Season 20 (2021)

Season 21 (2021)

Season 22 (2021)

Season 23 (2021-22)

Season 24 (2022)

Season 25 (2022)

Season 26 (2022)

Season 27 (2022)

Season 28 (2022)

Season 29 (2022-23)

Season 30 (2023)

Specials

References

Lists of American comedy television series episodes